Henry Dominique Larcade Jr. (July 12, 1890 – March 15, 1966) was a U.S. Representative from Louisiana.

Born in Opelousas, St. Landry Parish, Louisiana, Larcade attended the public and parochial schools, Opelousas High School, Academy Immaculate Conception, and Opelousas Institute.
During the First World War, Larcade served as a private in the Three Hundred and Forty-eighth Infantry, Eighty-seventh Division, at Camp Pike in Arkansas, later obtaining a commission as second lieutenant, Quartermaster Corps, Officers' Reserve Corps.
He engaged in the banking business and the general insurance business.
He served as a member of the St. Landry Parish School Board 1913–1928.
He served as a member of the State senate 1928–1932.
He served as assistant clerk of the State senate 1932–1936.
He served in the State house of representatives 1936–1940, having succeeded Felix Octave Pavy.

Larcade was elected as a Democrat to the Seventy-eighth and to the four succeeding Congresses (January 3, 1943 – January 3, 1953).
He was not a candidate for renomination in 1952.
He served as a member of the State senate once again from 1956 to 1960, paired with Bill Cleveland of Acadia Parish.
He engaged in banking business.
He was a resident of Opelousas, Louisiana, until his death there March 15, 1966.
He was interred in St. Landry Cemetery.

References 

1890 births
1966 deaths
School board members in Louisiana
Democratic Party members of the Louisiana House of Representatives
Democratic Party Louisiana state senators
People from Opelousas, Louisiana
Quartermasters
United States Army officers
Democratic Party members of the United States House of Representatives from Louisiana
20th-century American politicians
Catholics from Louisiana